Agus Basuki Bin Suwito Hadiwiryono (5 March 1956 – 12 December 2007), or mononymously known as Basuki, was an Indonesian actor and comedian. He was born in Surakarta, Central Java. He was a member of the Indonesian comedy troupe, Srimulat. However, he became famous after appearing in the program, Si Doel Anak Sekolahan in 1996. He was also famous for creating a jingle called "Wes Ewes Ewes Bablas Angine" for a traditional medicine commercial.

Basuki collapsed following a game of futsal on 12 December 2007. He was rushed to Melia Hospital in Jakarta, Indonesia, where he died at the age of 51 (heart attack).

References

External links

1956 births
2007 deaths
20th-century comedians
Indonesian male comedians
Indonesian comedians
Indonesian male television actors
Javanese people
People from Surakarta